Frederick Henry Haselden (1849–1941) was a conservative Member of Parliament from the Taranaki Region in New Zealand for the Patea electorate.

Birth and family
Haselden was born on 24 December 1846 in Marylebone, Middlesex, England. He was the son of Rev. Charles Haselden and Maria Simpson Moore. The family emigrated to New Zealand aboard the SS Mermaid in 1860. His brother was a Wellingtom stipendary magistrate.

Life in New Zealand
Before October 1896, Haselden had become a sheep farmer in Hunterville, Taranaki Region. He was also appointed a Justice of the Peace.

Parliamentary career
Following the resignation of George Hutchison, he was elected for Patea in an 18 July 1901 by-election. After an electoral petition the seat was declared vacant from 9 October 1901. He was re-elected in the subsequent 6 November by-election, but was defeated in the 1902 general election.

Later life
Haselden later moved to South Africa, where he died in 1941.

References

1849 births
1941 deaths
Members of the New Zealand House of Representatives
Unsuccessful candidates in the 1902 New Zealand general election
Unsuccessful candidates in the 1908 New Zealand general election
New Zealand MPs for North Island electorates
19th-century New Zealand politicians
Date of birth missing
New Zealand justices of the peace